Tropico is the fifth studio album by American rock singer Pat Benatar, released on November 1, 1984, by Chrysalis Records. It is the first album to feature one-time John Waite bassist Donnie Nossov, who replaced Roger Capps in Benatar's band.

It peaked at No. 14 on the U.S. Billboard 200 album chart and produced the Grammy-nominated Top Five Pop hit "We Belong". Other well-known songs from the album include "Painted Desert", "Outlaw Blues" and "Ooh Ooh Song" (also a Top 40 hit). A Spanish version of "Ooh Ooh Song" was on the B-side of the US single and appeared also on her 1999 compilation, Synchronistic Wanderings. Tropico was Benatar's sixth consecutive Platinum-certified album in the United States.

During the filming of the video for the single "Painted Desert", Benatar and husband Neil Giraldo discovered they were expecting their first child.
This album is Benatar and Giraldo's first attempt to move away from Benatar's famed "hard rock" sound and start experimenting with new "gentler" styles and new wave sounds.

BGO Records reissued Tropico on CD with Seven the Hard Way.

Track listing

Personnel

Band members
Pat Benatar – vocals
Neil Giraldo – guitars, harmonica, percussion
Charlie Giordano – keyboards, percussion
Donnie Nossov – bass, backing vocals on track 6
Myron Grombacher – drums, percussion

Additional musicians
Roger Capps – bass on tracks 2 and 3
Lenny Castro – percussion on tracks 3 and 9
Unknown – backing vocals on track 2

Production
Neil Giraldo, Peter Coleman – producers, mixing at The Complex Studios and Sound Castle Studios, Los Angeles
Dave Hernandez – assistant engineer, Spanish translation of track 6
Murray Dvorkin, Bino Espinoza – mixing assistants
George Marino – mastering at Sterling Sound, New York

Charts

Weekly charts

Year-end charts

Certifications

External links
"Tropico" at discogs

Notes

References

Bibliography

 

1984 albums
Chrysalis Records albums
Pat Benatar albums